"Why Didn't I Think of That" is a song written by Bob McDill and Paul Harrison, and recorded by American country music singer Doug Stone. The song reached the top of the Billboard Hot Country Singles & Tracks chart.  It was released in June 1993 as the fourth and final single from his CD From the Heart. It is also last number one hit that Doug had in the United States, while he'd have one more number one in Canada with Addicted to a Dollar. This song was originally recorded by the Marshall Tucker Band in 1988 on their "Still Holdin' On" album.

Content
The song's narrator is a man who did not treat his lady right, so he watches another man treat his lady right.

Chart positions

Year-end charts

References

1993 singles
Doug Stone songs
Songs written by Bob McDill
Epic Records singles
Song recordings produced by Doug Johnson (record producer)
1993 songs